The 1998 Nicholls State Colonels football team represented Nicholls State University as a member of the Southland Football League during the 1998 NCAA Division I-AA football season. Led by Darren Barbier in his fourth and final season as head coach, the Colonels compiled an overall record of 4–7 with a mark of 3–4 in conference play, placing fifth in the Southland. Nicholls State played home games at John L. Guidry Stadium in Thibodaux, Louisiana.

Schedule

References

Nicholls State
Nicholls Colonels football seasons
Nicholls State Colonels football